Otis Murphy (born 1972) is an American classical saxophonist and saxophone professor at Indiana University's Jacobs School of Music. He joined in 2001 and became one of the youngest members of its faculty in the school's history.

Biography
Murphy has primarily studied with esteemed saxophonists Eugene Rousseau and Jean-Yves Fourmeau. Murphy has won numerous awards and prizes which include 2nd Prize in the Adolphe Sax International Saxophone Competition (1998) in Belgium, 3rd Prize in the Jean-Marie Londeix International Saxophone Competition (1996) in France, 1st Prize in the Heida Hermanns Young Artist Competition, 2nd Prize in the St. Louis Symphony Young Artist Competition, and the J. William Fulbright grant that allowed saxophone study in France.

He is an active saxophone soloist and clinician who is in great demand throughout the world. In addition to his frequent solo appearances throughout the United States, he has also performed and given saxophone classes in France, Switzerland, Germany, the United Kingdom, Canada, Japan, Belgium, and Italy. Dr. Murphy is a Yamaha performing artist and a D'Addario performing artist.

Discography
"Memories of Dinant," Otis Murphy and Haruko Murphy
"Fantasy," Otis Murphy and Haruko Murphy
"Song," Otis Murphy and the Indiana University Wind Ensemble

References

External links 
 Otis Murphy's Personal Website
 Indiana University Saxophone Studio

American male saxophonists
Classical saxophonists
Jacobs School of Music faculty
1972 births
Living people
21st-century American saxophonists
21st-century American male musicians